Asaduzzaman may refer to:

 Amanullah Asaduzzaman (1942–1969), Bangladeshi student activist
 Asaduzzaman Noor (born 1946), Bangladeshi actor, politician
 Mohammad Asaduzzaman (died 2008), Bangladeshi educator
 Asaduzzaman Khan (born 1950), Bangladeshi minister of home affairs
 Asaduzzaman Mohammad Raisul Islam (born 1953), Bangladeshi actor